Kowalki may refer to the following places:

Poland
Kowalki, Kuyavian-Pomeranian Voivodeship (north-central Poland)
Kowalki, Warmian-Masurian Voivodeship (north Poland)
Kowalki, West Pomeranian Voivodeship (north-west Poland)

Lithuania
Kalviai (Varėna district)